There have been two Government of Wales acts of the UK Parliament:

 The Government of Wales Act 1998, founding Wales's legislature
 The Government of Wales Act 2006, extending its powers and creating the Welsh Government

See also
 Wales Act 1978, repealed 1979
 Northern Ireland Act, several pieces of legislation
 Scotland Act (disambiguation)